Skomlya Hill (‘Halm Skomlya’ \'h&lm 'sko-mlya\) is the rocky hill rising to 353 m at the base of a promontory projecting from Trinity Peninsula in Graham Land, Antarctica, 5.5 km eastwards into Prince Gustav Channel and ending in View Point.  Surmounting Duse Bay to the northeast and Eyrie Bay to the southwest.

The hill is named after the settlement of Skomlya in Northwestern Bulgaria.

Location
German-British mapping in 1996.

Maps
 Trinity Peninsula. Scale 1:250000 topographic map No. 5697. Institut für Angewandte Geodäsie and British Antarctic Survey, 1996.
 Antarctic Digital Database (ADD). Scale 1:250000 topographic map of Antarctica. Scientific Committee on Antarctic Research (SCAR). Since 1993, regularly updated.

Notes

References
 Skomlya Hill. SCAR Composite Antarctic Gazetteer
 Bulgarian Antarctic Gazetteer. Antarctic Place-names Commission. (details in Bulgarian, basic data in English)

External links
 Skomlya Hill. Copernix satellite image

Hills of Trinity Peninsula
Bulgaria and the Antarctic